The 2021 Rhythmic Gymnastics European Championships was the 37th edition of the Rhythmic Gymnastics European Championships, which took place on 9–13 June 2021 at the Palace of Culture and Sports in Varna, Bulgaria.

Participating countries

Updated on June 8th 2021.

Competition schedule
Wednesday June 9
10:00–11:40 Junior groups qualification & AA ranking (5 Balls, 5 Ribbons – SET A 1-12)
11:55–13:35 Junior groups qualification & AA ranking (5 Balls, 5 Ribbons – SET B 13-24)
18:30–19:00 Opening Ceremony
19:00–19:40 Junior groups 5 Balls Final
19:55–20:35 Junior groups 5 Ribbons Final
20:35–20:50 Award ceremony Junior groups All-Around
20:50–21:05 Award ceremony Junior groups Apparatus Final
Thursday June 10
10:00–12:00 Set A Senior Individuals qualifications (hoop & ball)
12:15–14:15 Set B Senior Individuals qualifications (hoop & ball)
15:15–17:15 Set C Senior Individuals qualifications (hoop & ball)
17:30–19:30 Set D Senior Individuals qualifications (hoop & ball)
Friday June 11
10:00–12:00 Set C Senior Individuals qualifications (clubs & ribbon)
12:15–14:15 Set D Senior Individuals qualifications (clubs & ribbon)
15:15-17:15 Set A Senior Individuals qualifications (clubs & ribbon)
17:30–19:30 Set B Senior Individuals qualifications (clubs & ribbon)
Saturday June 12
10:00–12:25 Senior Individuals AA Final (hoop, ball, clubs, ribbon – SET A)
12:40–15:05 Senior Individuals AA Final (hoop, ball, clubs, ribbon –SET B)
15:05–15:20 Award Ceremony AA Seniors Individuals
16:30-18:00 Senior Groups (5 balls and 3 hoops & 2 pairs of clubs – SET A)
18:15–19:40 Senior Groups (5 balls and 3 hoops & 2 pairs of clubs – SET B)
19:40–19:55 Award Ceremony AA Senior Groups
19:55–20:10 Award Ceremony Team (Senior Individuals and Senior Groups)
Sunday June 13
10:00–11:05 Senior Individuals Hoop & Ball Finals
11:10–12:15 Senior Individuals Clubs & Ribbon Finals
12:15-12:30 Award Ceremony Senior Individual Apparatus finals
13:00–13:40 Senior Groups 5 Balls Final
13:45–14:25 Senior Groups 3 Hoops + 4 Clubs Final
14:25–15:00 Award Ceremony Senior Groups Apparatus finals
Source:

Medal winners

Results

Team

Senior Individual

All-Around

Hoop

Ball

Clubs

Ribbon

Junior Group

All-Around

5 Balls

5 Ribbons

Senior Group

All-Around

5 Balls

3 Hoops + 4 Clubs

Medal count

References

Rhythmic Gymnastics European Championships
European Rhythmic Gymnastics Championships
International gymnastics competitions hosted by Bulgaria
Rhythmic Gymnastics European Championships
Sport in Varna, Bulgaria
Rhythmic